Ikram Kabbaj is a sculpture artist from Casablanca, Morocco.

Life 
She was born in Casablanca in 1960. She received her education from the École des Beaux-Arts in Paris, studying there from 1978 to 1987 and specializing in sculpture. She lives and works between Casablanca and Marrakesh.

Works and Exhibitions 
Kabbaj's work is shown nationally in Morocco and abroad. Her work was featured in the Rabat Biennale at the Muhammad VI Museum of Modern and Contemporary Art in 2019.

With her 17m tall piece entitled "," Kabbaj won the 2016 Autoroutes du Maroc Prize for Plastic Arts.

Style 
Kabbaj primarily sculpts stone and marble.

Resources 

People from Casablanca
1960 births
Living people
École des Beaux-Arts alumni
Moroccan women sculptors
Moroccan sculptors